Aker Brygge is a neighbourhood in central Oslo, Norway. Since the 1980s and 1990s it has been a popular area for shopping, dining, and entertainment, as well as a high-end residential area. It was previously an industrial area.

Location
Aker Brygge is located just west of downtown on the westside of Pipervika, an arm of the Oslo Fjord, on the former ship yard of Akers Mekaniske Verksted, which ceased operations in 1982. Prior to the establishment of the shipyard in 1854, the area was known as Holmen. It was then an old yard where some minor industrial activity, and a suburban establishment grew in the early 19th century.

Aker Brygge is served by the Aker Brygge tram station.

History
The area contained shipyards and engineering industry - Aker Mekaniske Verksted AS - until 1982.

The construction of Aker Brygge was carried out in four steps by the realtors Aker Eiendom AS. A few old industrial buildings were demolished, while several of the major workshop halls were rebuilt as shopping areas. The first step of the construction was finished in 1986, with Telje, Torp and Aasen as architects. The fourth and final construction, the Storebrand insurance building facing Munkedamsveien, was completed in 1998. The area consists of a shopping center with shops and restaurants, a cinema, office space, and apartments. Additionally, there is a small boat harbour, and a terminal for the ferries to Nesodden. The area measures 260,000 m2.

Today, about 6,000 people work in Aker Brygge and approximately 900 people have their homes here.

Aker Brygge was also the scene of an infamous gang-related shootout 19 August 2006. The shooting happened in bright daylight, with several hundred bystanders, including children and tourists in the line of fire. Only two people were wounded and nobody was killed in the incident.

The area today

A masterplan led by Space Group Company and Ghilardi + Hellsten reorganized the area between 2010 and 2014. Space Group worked on activating the parallel streets, and created an inside street, going through the main buildings. Aker Brygge is a leader in Norway for waterfront development and it is one of the most visited place in Oslo with 12 million visitors each year.

Aker Brygge area today consists of 13 separate units and 9 of them are divided into a total of 823 owner units. The properties are bound together through a comprehensive working agreement thereby creating a new district of Oslo which is unique in both a national and international perspective. A number of well situated public areas and arrangements have been developed through cooperation between apartment owners, and business and cultural interests. The administration of the working agreement and the carrying out of such tasks is done by the commonly owned company Bryggedrift AS.

Monuments
In 2010 a monument of Max Manus was moved away from Aker Brygge, after members of the Pelle group had pointed out that their group was responsible for the 1944 big ship sabotage at present day Aker Brygge.

The Astrup Fearnley Museum of Modern Art, designed by Renzo Piano, is near Aker Brygge.

References

External links

Ferry quays in Oslo
Neighbourhoods of Oslo
Fjord City